Mactaquac Provincial Park is a Canadian provincial park with an area of . It is located on the Saint John River 15 kilometres west of Fredericton, New Brunswick in the community of Mactaquac.

The park was created in the 1960s during the construction of the Mactaquac Dam. It contains a golf course, campground, two beaches, hiking trails, and cross-country skiing trails in the winter.

Activities
There are activities such as kayaking, hiking, cross-country skiing, swimming and fresh water beaches.

External links

 Protected Planet Database: Mactaquac Provincial Park
 Mactaquac Provincial Park

Provincial parks of New Brunswick
Geography of York County, New Brunswick
Tourist attractions in York County, New Brunswick
Beaches of New Brunswick
Landforms of York County, New Brunswick
1965 establishments in New Brunswick